Cheng Sihan (1961 – 6 November 2019), also known as Cheng Shihan, was a Chinese actor, known for playing major supporting roles in many television dramas and films, including Journey to the West: Conquering the Demons (2013) and The Taking of Tiger Mountain (2017).

Biography 
Cheng was born in 1961 in Jiamusi, Heilongjiang, China. After graduating from high school, he worked as a truck driver from 1979 to 1984. In October 1983, he struck a horse-drawn carriage while driving, injuring one person. He was later involved in another traffic accident and decided to change his career.

In 1986, Cheng tested into the Art Academy of Harbin Normal University, majoring in design. However, after his then girlfriend broke up with him, he quit his studies and moved south to Hainan Island in 1989.

In the late 1980s, Hainan was designated a special economic zone by the Chinese government and attracted migrants from all over the country. Like many other migrants, however, Cheng was unable to find a job there and had to sleep on the street after spending all his money. Desperate for work, he went to a film director he had met on the ferry to Hainan for help. The director took pity on him and gave him a background role as a migrant worker in the film Hot Love, which marked the beginning of Cheng's acting career. He then auditioned for a role (as Li Yi) in the film Tianya Liren. Li Yi is an artist who is out of a job and becomes homeless in Hainan, which closely matched Cheng's own experience. He was therefore selected to play the role, his first credited appearance in a film.

Cheng moved to Beijing in 1995. In 1998, he had his breakout role as Zhu Fu in the television series The Water Margin, based on the eponymous classical novel. He later appeared in the TV series Mission of the Warriors (武林外史, 2001), Wind and Cloud (2002), The Proud Twins (2005), and Journey to the West (2010). He also starred in many films, including The Painted Veil (2006), Journey to the West: Conquering the Demons (2013) and The Taking of Tiger Mountain (2014). He was known for his freewheeling and often exaggerative performance, and is considered by many as a comedian.

Personal life 
Cheng was married twice. He had a daughter and a son, Cheng Zemiao.

Cheng died on 6 November 2019 from a heart attack, aged 58.

Filmography

References

External links 

Cheng Sihan on Douban 
 

1961 births
2019 deaths
Male actors from Heilongjiang
People from Jiamusi
Harbin Normal University alumni
20th-century Chinese male actors
21st-century Chinese male actors